The Audi R8 (Type 4S) is the second generation of the R8 sports car manufactured by German automobile manufacturer Audi. The Type 4S is based on the Lamborghini Huracán and shares its platform and engine. The Type 4S was introduced at the 2015 Geneva Motor Show and its production began in late 2015.

Development  
Development of the Type 4S began in 2013 and prototypes began testing in early-2014. The Type 4S is based on the Modular Sports System platform shared with the Lamborghini Huracán. The V10 engine used in the Huracàn was detuned for the base model while the power output of the engine remained the same as the Huracàn for the V10 plus model. Rumors for the V8 engine for the R8 were in circulation but those were proven wrong as the company stated that the V8 engine would be discontinued mainly because of emissions regulations. The Type 4S was introduced at the 2015 Geneva Motor Show. The all-electric version called the e-Tron which was in development phase in the production life span of the Type 42 was also introduced at the same occasion and was now based on the Type 4S.

Road models

R8 Coupé

The new R8 has two production variants, the base 5.2 FSI model with a  V10 engine and the more powerful V10 Plus with a  engine. The body is lighter and stiffer, due to the substitution of several large aluminium parts in the shell by carbon fibre. Extra electronics are incorporated in the chassis as compared to the first generation to improve handling. The ‘Virtual Cockpit’ first introduced in the TT was also made available. The all-wheel-drive system and the 7-speed S-Tronic transmission are standard with no manual transmission available. The Quattro all-wheel-drive system used on the R8 is slightly rear-biased with power delivery to the wheels variable. A water-cooled front differential and a passive limited-slip rear differential along with an electromechanical power steering contribute to the agile handling of the car. The variable magnetic-ride suspension is available as an option but is exclusive to the European markets.

The design reflects Audi's current design language implemented on all of its models. The distinctive "side-blades" present behind the doors on the Type 42 have now been split into two and are now present on the rear side windows and below the beltline. The side blades can be optioned in body colour. Audi's trademark LED headlamps were standard on the car and the newly developed laser headlamps are available as an option in Europe only.

The R8 is available with 19-inch wheels as standard with 20-inch wheels available as an option. Carbon-ceramic brakes are also optional equipment.

In July 2020, Audi announced that it would be discontinuing the 5.2 FSI model in the United States. A special model called the limited edition having production limited to 25 Coupes and 5 Spyders was introduced. The limited-edition is available in three special colours namely Mugello Blue with Pastel silver interior, Avus Silver with black interior with silver stitching, and Sonoma Green with black interior and red stitching. All cars have diamond-stitched Alcantara headliners along with special 20-inch milled silver wheels.

R8 Spyder

Presented at the 2016 New York International Auto Show, the R8 Spyder is the convertible variant of the new R8.

Facelift 

The R8 received a mid-cycle facelift in October 2018. The base V10 was renamed V10 quattro, while V10 plus was renamed V10 performance quattro. Other mechanical changes include gasoline particulate filter on all models, the choice of Michelin Pilot Sport Cup 2 tyres, larger carbon-ceramic brakes, and a new steering rack system for a more direct response. A carbon fibre roll bar is also optional which decreases the weight by 2 kg.

Exterior changes included more angular and aggressive styling. The new front bumper of the car has a squared design and winglets on both sides to improve front downforce. The grille was enlarged and now stretched between the headlights. Above the grille, three small horizontal air intakes are present between the headlights for improved airflow harking back to the famous Audi Quattro. Side skirts finished in exposed carbon fibre now flank the sides of the car and at the rear, a single wide grille is now present beneath the taillights joined by an aggressive diffuser and two round dual exhaust tips in exposed and sculptured cut-outs.

The interior was carried over from the outgoing model with new trim options available.

Performance figures include a  acceleration time of 3.5 seconds for the base model and 3.1 seconds for the V10 Performance quattro model. The facelift model went on sale in Europe in early 2019.

Audi R8 RWD
Audi announced on 19 November 2019 that the R8 V10 RWD models would become permanent in its lineup. Both R8 Spyder and Coupe models will sport the same  and  V10 FSI engine used in the limited edition RWS models. Comparing to RWS models, V10 RWD features more aggressive weight reductions. Both models feature a 40:60 weight distribution, similar to the RWS. Despite being a production model, some additional equipment and features are only available to V10 quattro models. The V10 RWD is visually similar to its quattro siblings. The quattro badge on the dashboard is replaced with an RWD badge.

On 7 October 2021, Audi introduced an uprated version for the V10 RWD, named V10 performance RWD. In addition to a power increase, more performance and handling options from quattro models are made available to the RWD model. These include dynamic steering, carbon fibre stabilizers and ceramic disc brakes. The V10 performance RWD model will replace the less powerful V10 RWD as Audi's only rear-wheel drive R8 offering. The base V10 quattro is also replaced by this model.

Special models

R8 e-Tron 

The production version of the Audi R8 e-tron was introduced at the 2015 Geneva Motor Show. The limited production electric sports car was available only in Europe. Fewer than 100 units were sold at the end-of-production run.
 
The battery pack consisted of a 92kWh T-shaped liquid cooled Lithium-ion battery.

R8 RWS

Unveiled at the 2017 International Motor Show Germany, the R8 RWS (Rear Wheel Series) is the rear-wheel-drive variant of the Audi R8 limited to 999 units. It utilises the same  V10 engine of the standard R8 V10. Weight distribution are 40.6:59.4 for Coupé and 40.4:59.6 for Spyder. Visually, the R8 RWS is signified by a matte-black grille, matte-black front and rear airflow openings, and a gloss-black upper side blade. A red vinyl trim stripe that stretches from the front left to the right rear is optional. The quattro badge on the interior passenger dash is replaced by the RWS badge instead. Sports seats are standard, as are black 19-inch wheels wrapped in 35-series tyres.

R8 Decennium

Introduced at the 2019 Geneva Motor Show, the R8 Decennium (Latin for "Decade") is a special edition model celebrating ten years of the V10 model of the R8 sports car. The R8 Decennium is based on the R8 V10 performance quattro. Notable changes include 20-inch alloy wheels and engine cover in Bronze finish, aerodynamic elements finished in gloss black, specially developed matte Daytona Grey body colour, black Alcantara/leather interior upholstery with carbon fibre trim and diamond stitching and Decennium badging. The R8 Decennium is limited to 222 units world wide (50 of which will be imported to the United States) and will only be offered in a coupé bodystyle.

R8 Star of Lucis
The Audi R8 Star of Lucis is a one-off special edition replica of the car used in the fantasy film Kingsglaive: Final Fantasy XV. Within the Final Fantasy XV universe, the car was developed as a collaboration between Audi and the Royal Art Society of Lucis as a coming-of-age present for Noctis Lucis Caelum, prince of the fictional Kingdom of Lucis. In 2016, Audi launched a raffle for the opportunity to buy the car, however, the car was also displayed and auctioned at the 2019 Tokyo Auto Salon. The car features custom rear spoiler, wheels, and various body panels decorated with symbols associated with the Kingdom of Lucis.

R8 Coupe GT RWD
Announced in October 2022, the R8 GT is a special edition limited to just 333 units that has been lightened and received performance upgrades for better handling and performance.

Specifications

Facelift (MY 2019–)

Motorsport

R8 LMS (GT3)

The Audi R8 LMS is the racing version of the R8. Despite looking identical to a regular R8, the LMS shares very little with its road-going counterpart in terms of features and mechanics. The removal of the standard all-wheel-drive system and the intelligent mix of materials such as aluminum in the Audi Space Frame (ASF), a structural CFRP component and the steel roll cage alone make the chassis about  lighter - now weighing . At the same time, the torsional stiffness of the stressed frame has increased by 39 percent. These weight-saving measures result in a weight of just 
. Aside from that, the car packs many safety features such as a modified spaceframe structure at the front and a carbon fibre crash element at the rear protect the driver in a crash, the special PS1 racing seat from the Audi R18 e-Tron Quattro which has been known to set the safety standards for LMP1 cars is used for additional safety and is connected directly to the chassis for increased stiffness. A quickly adjustable foot lever system and a height and length adjustable safety steering column allow versatile adjustment to various drivers. A rescue opening in the roof as used in DTM race touring cars is implemented in the R8 LMS GT3, a first for any GT3 car, after an accident, it allows the driver's helmet to be lifted in a way that avoids straining the spinal column.

Although the combination of the materials in the R8 LMS is more complex, Audi has managed to integrate the manufacturing process for production and race cars even more closely than before. In a new manufacturing facility at the Bollinger Hofe industrial park in Heilbronn, Quattro GmbH produces both variants in combination. Although the race car, for example, is fitted with aluminum cast joints and a steel roll cage the racing chassis of the R8 LMS remains integrated into the basic production process up to and including the stages of the roof assembly and cathodic dip painting (CDP), which is a form of priming. Following these production steps, the race cars are completed in Heilbronn-Biberach. The new aerodynamic concept of the Audi R8 LMS for the first time includes a fully lined underfloor and a conceptually integrated rear diffuser. As a result, the dimensions of the rear wing can be reduced without a corresponding increase of aerodynamic drag. The wheel arches, which are open rearwards via a larger cross-section, contribute to improved airflow. The airflow rate and cooling area of the radiator at the front have increased by ten percent to handle maximum outside air temperatures. In order to improve the race drivers' ability to concentrate on their tasks, fresh air circulation in the cockpit has been improved. Audi has achieved these improvements despite the significantly higher constraints imposed on aerodynamics design by the 2016 regulations.

The Audi R8 LMS Evo was unveiled in 2018 ahead of the 2019 season. The car saw new bodywork, including a new front splitter to improve downforce, and an improved gearbox. The car was available for customers to buy as new, or as an evo kit for pre-existing Audi R8 LMS models.

In 2021 Audi Sport revealed the Audi R8 LMS Evo II, which saw improved Aerodynamics, engine characteristics, air conditioning, suspension and traction control. The car is available to buy as new, or as an upgrade kit for a previous generation Audi R8 LMS.

R8 LMS GT4 

Audi Sport introduced a version of the R8 for GT4-class racing at the 2017 New York International Auto Show held in April. Like the LMS GT3, the GT4 also uses a rear-wheel-drive drive layout. Performance figures include a  acceleration time of 3 seconds and a top speed of  depending on racing conditions. The GT4 is eligible to compete in 13 world wide racing series and is designed to be an entry level racing model for amateur racing drivers.

R8 LMS (GT2)
The Audi R8 LMS GT2 was unveiled by audi at the 2019 Goodwood festival of speed. The car has features a high-performance engine with 640 hp, making it the most powerful car in the history of Audi customer racing. The car is eligible to compete in any series featuring the SRO GT2 class. The car has seen a lot of success, including an overall win at the 2022 24 hours of Zolder.

Motorsports history 

The Audi R8 has been used as a safety car for the Deutsche Tourenwagen Masters and British Superbike Championship racing series as well as the FIA World Endurance Championship and the 24 Hours of Le Mans.

The Audi R8 LMS won the 2018 Bathurst 12 hour race.

Reception 
The Type 4S received generally positive reviews from the motoring press. Australian automotive publication Car Advice praised its daily usability along with its modern design and technology but criticised the lack of a manual transmission and an affordable V8 model. British magazine Autocar tested the standard V10 FSI coupé and praised its naturally aspirated engine and agile handling. However, the publication favoured the high performance Plus variant more stating that the cost difference between the Plus and the standard model with options was simply too slim. The publication gave the verdict: "Audi sends its mid-engined flagship in search of supercar scalps, and largely succeeds - even if rivals like the Porsche 911 Turbo provide greater driving limits." US automotive magazine Car & Driver tested the V10 plus and praised the aggressive design language with less radical "sideblades" along with quick acceleration and the engine noise but criticised the unavailability of some features on the US market cars such as magnetorheological dampers and laser headlamps.

References

External links 
Official Audi R8 website 

R08
R08
Coupés
Convertibles
Rear mid-engine, all-wheel-drive vehicles
Rear mid-engine, rear-wheel-drive vehicles
Sports cars
Cars introduced in 2015
2020s cars
Electric vehicles